OSN may refer to:
 OSN, a multinational premium entertainment content company based in Dubai
 OSN (rapper), a Taiwanese rapper and singer
 Osan Air Base, the IATA code OSN
 Osiyan railway station, the station code OSN
 ISO 639:osn, the ISO 639 code for the Old Sundanese language
 Ocean State Networks, a channel that replaces NewsChannel 5